Inocybe is a large genus of mushroom-producing fungi in the order Agaricales. The genus is widely distributed in the Northern Hemisphere. , Index Fungorum accepts 848 species in Inocybe.

A B C D E F G H I J K L M N O P Q R S T U V U W X Y Z

A

Inocybe aberrans (E.Horak) Garrido 1988
Inocybe abietis Kühner 1953
Inocybe abnormispora Alessio 1987
Inocybe abundans Murrill 1911
Inocybe acriolen Grund & D.E.Stuntz 1975
Inocybe acuta Boud. 1917
Inocybe acutata Tak. Kobay. & Nagas. 1993  
Inocybe acutoides Kokkonen & Vauras 2013
Inocybe acystidiosa Kauffman 1924
Inocybe adaequata (Britzelm.) Sacc. 1887 – Europe 
 Inocybe aeruginascens Babos 1970 (psychoactive)
Inocybe aestiva Kropp, Matheny & Hutchison 2013 – USA
Inocybe agardhii (N.Lund) P.D.Orton 1960 – United Kingdom
Inocybe agglutinata Peck 1888
Inocybe agordina Bizio 2000
Inocybe alabamensis Kauffman 1924
Inocybe alachuana Murrill 1941
Inocybe albicans Velen. 1920
Inocybe albidipes Cleland & Cheel 1918
Inocybe albido-ochracea (Britzelm.) Sacc. & Traverso 1910
Inocybe albodisca Peck 1898
Inocybe albofibrillosa Stangl & Schmid-Heckel 1985
Inocybe albomarginata Velen. 1920 – United Kingdom
Inocybe alboperonata Kühner 1988
Inocybe albopruinata Herp. 1912
Inocybe albovelata Reumaux 1984
Inocybe albovelutipes Stangl 1980 – United Kingdom
Inocybe albovestita E.Horak 1978
Inocybe alboviscida (E.Horak) Garrido 1988
Inocybe alienospora (Corner & E.Horak) Garrido 1988
Inocybe alluvionis Stangl & J.Veselský 1976
Inocybe alnea Stangl 1979
Inocybe alpigenes  (E.Horak) Bon 1997
Inocybe althoffiae E. Horak 1979
Inocybe amazoniensis Singer & I.J.A.Aguiar 1983
Inocybe ambigua Romagn. 1979
Inocybe amblyospora Kühner 1955
Inocybe amethystina Kuyper 1986 – United Kingdom      
Inocybe amicta Kokkonen & Vauras 2013
Inocybe ammophila G.F.Atk. 1918
Inocybe amoenolens Kühner 1988
Inocybe ampullaceocystidiata Shchukin 1985
Inocybe amygdalispora Métrod 1956
Inocybe amygdalospora Métrod ex Cheype & Contu 2005
Inocybe angulatosquamulosa Stangl 1984
Inocybe angustifolia (Corner & E. Horak) Garrido 1988
Inocybe angustispora Bessette & Fatto 1998
Inocybe annulata Velen. 1920
Inocybe antillana Pegler 1983 – Martinique
Inocybe apiosmota Grund & D.E. Stuntz 1975
Inocybe appendiculata Kühner 1955 – United Kingdom
Inocybe arenicola(R.Heim) Bon 1983 – United Kingdom
Inocybe argentea (Singer) Singer 1931
Inocybe argenteolutea Vauras 1997 
Inocybe argentina Speg. 1898
Inocybe argillacea (Pers.) Singer 1961
Inocybe armeniaca Huijsman 1974
Inocybe armoricana R.Heim 1931
Inocybe arthrocystis Kühner 1988
Inocybe assimilata Britzelm. 1881 – United Kingdom
Inocybe asterospora Quél. 1880 – Europe
Inocybe astoriana Murrill 1911
Inocybe atroumbonata Hongo 1966
Inocybe aurantiifolia Beller 1979
Inocybe aurantiobrunnea Esteve-Rav. & García Blanco 2003
Inocybe aurantiocystidiata E.Turnbull & Watling 1995
Inocybe aurantioumbonata Franchi & M.Marchetti 2008
Inocybe aurea Huijsman 1955 – United Kingdom
Inocybe aureostipes Kobayasi 1952
Inocybe auricoma (Batsch) Sacc. 1887 – United Kingdom
Inocybe auricomella Kühner 1988
Inocybe aurivenia (Batsch) Bres. 1930
Inocybe australiensis Cleland & Cheel 1918
Inocybe austrofibrillosa Grgur. 2002
Inocybe avellanea Kobayasi 1952
Inocybe avenacea Velen. 1920
Inocybe ayangannae Matheny, Aime & T.W.Henkel 2003
Inocybe ayeri Furrer-Ziogas 1987

B

Inocybe bakeri Peck 1909
Inocybe barrasae Esteve-Rav. 2001
Inocybe basicitrata Jul.Schäff. ex Moënne-Locc. 2000
Inocybe bipindiensis Henn. 1901
Inocybe bispora Hongo 1958
Inocybe bivela Kühner 1988
Inocybe borealis J.E.Lange 1957
Inocybe boreocarelica Kokkonen & Vauras 2013
Inocybe bresadolae Massee 1904 – United Kingdom
Inocybe bresadolana Bon 1983 – United Kingdom
Inocybe brevicystis Métrod ex Kuyper 1986
Inocybe breviterincarnata D.E.Stuntz ex Kropp, Matheny & Hutchison 2013 – USA
Inocybe bridgesiana Singer 1953
Inocybe brunnea Quél. 1880
Inocybe brunneolipes   Grund & D.E. Stuntz 1970
Inocybe brunneotomentosa  Huijsman 1978 – United Kingdom
Inocybe brunneovillosa  (Jungh.) Dörfelt & Zschiesch. 1986
Inocybe brunnescens Earle 1905
Inocybe bubakii Velen. 1920
Inocybe bufonia Kokkonen & Vauras 2013
Inocybe bulbosa Peck 1909
Inocybe bulbosissima (Kühner) Bon 1992

C

Inocybe caballeroi  C.E.Hermos. & Esteve-Rav. 2005
Inocybe caespitosa  Velen. 1922
Inocybe caespitosella Speg. 1926
Inosperma calamistratoides E. Horak
Inocybe calcaris  Métrod 1953
Inocybe calida Velen. 1920 – United Kingdom
Inocybe californica Kauffman 1924
Inocybe calopedes Matheny & Bougher 2010
Inocybe calospora  Quél. 1881 – Europe
Inocybe candidipes Kropp & Matheny 2004
Inocybe canescens J.Favre 1955
Inocybe carelica Singer 1938
Inocybe caroticolor – China
Inocybe carpinacea Velen. 1947
Inocybe castanea Peck 1904
Inocybe castaneoides Peck 1913
Inocybe castanopsis Hruby 193
Inocybe casuarinae Corner & E. Horak 1979
Inocybe catalaunica Singer 1947 – United Kingdom
Inocybe caucasica Singer 1937
Inocybe cavipes (Britzelm.) Sacc. & Traverso 1910
Inocybe cerasphora Singer 1953
Inocybe cercocarpi Kropp, Matheny & Hutchison 2013 – USA
Inocybe cerea E.Horak 1978
Inocybe cerina (Malençon) Bon 1996
Inocybe cervicolor (Pers.) Quél. 1886 – Europe
Inocybe chalcodoxantha Grund & D.E.Stuntz 1968
Inocybe chelanensis D.E.Stuntz 1947
Inocybe chilensis Singer 1965
Inocybe chondroderma – Pacific Northwest, North America
Inocybe chondrospora Einhell. & Stangl 1979
Inocybe chrysocephala  F.H.Nishida 1988
Inocybe chrysochroa Tak. Kobay. & Courtec. 1993
Inocybe cinchonensis (Murrill) Dennis 1968
Inocybe cincinnata (Fr.) Quél. 1872 – United Kingdom
Inocybe cinerascentipes Huijsman 1955
Inocybe cingulata  E.Horak 1979
Inocybe cingulatipes (Corner & E. Horak) Garrido 1988
Inocybe cinnabarina Hruby 1930
Inocybe cinnamomea A.H.Sm. 1941 – Western Cape Province
Inocybe cinnamomicolor Reumaux 2001
Inocybe cistobulbipes Esteve-Rav. & Vila 2002
Inocybe citrinofolia  Métrod 1956
Inocybe clavata Takah. Kobay. 2002
Inocybe claviger E.Horak & Bas 1981
 Inocybe coelestium Kuyper 1985 (psychoactive)
Inocybe coerulescens Kobayasi 1952
Inocybe collivaga Velen. 1920
Inocybe comatella (Peck) Sacc. 1887
Inocybe concinnula  J.Favre 1955
Inocybe confusa P.Karst. 1888
Inocybe congregata A.Pearson 1950 – Western Cape Province
Inocybe conica P.Larsen 1931
Inocybe conicoalba E.Horak 1979
Inocybe connexa Kauffman 1924
Inocybe conspicuispora Buyck & Eyssart. 1999
Inocybe copriniformis Reumaux 2005
Inocybe corcontica Velen. 1920
Inocybe cordae Velen. 1920
Inocybe corneri (E.Horak) Garrido 1988
Inocybe corrubescens Singer 1931
Inocybe cortinata Rolland 1901
 Inocybe corydalina Quél. 1875 (psychoactive) – Europe
Inocybe crassicystidiata Pegler 1983 – Martinique
Inocybe crassipes (Cooke & Massee) Pegler 1965
Inocybe cryptocystis D.E.Stuntz 1954 – United Kingdom
Inocybe curreyi (Berk.) Sacc. 1887 – United Kingdom
Inocybe curvipes  P.Karst. 1890 – Africa, Europe
Inocybe cutifracta Petch 1917 - India, Sri Lanka
Inocybe cyaneovirescens Henn. 1900
Inocybe cylindrispora Murrill 1945
Inocybe cylindrocystis G.F.Atk. 1918
Inocybe cystidiosa (A.H.Sm.) Singer 1951

D

Inocybe davisiana Kauffman 1924
Inocybe deborae E.Ferrari 2003
Inocybe decemgibbosa (Kühner) Vauras 1997 – United Kingdom
Inocybe decipiens Bres. 1892
Inocybe decipientoides Peck 1907
Inocybe deianae Eyssart. 2007
Inocybe deminuta Peck 1906
Inocybe demitrata Velen. 1920
Inocybe dentifera Velen. 1947
Inocybe derbschii Schwöbel & Stangl 1982
Inocybe desquamans Peck 1906
Inocybe destruens E.Horak 1978
Inocybe dewrangia Grgur. 1997
Inocybe diabolica Vauras 1994
Inocybe dilutecinnamomea Singer 195
Inocybe diminuta Peck 1906
Inocybe dissocystis Singer 1953
Inocybe distincta Latha, Manim. & Matheny 2016
Inocybe dolichospora Malençon 1970
Inocybe dulcamara (Pers.) P.Kumm. 1871
Inocybe dulcamaroides Kühner 1988
Inocybe dunensis P.D.Orton 1960 – United Kingdom
Inocybe duriuscula Rea 1908 – United Kingdom

E

Inocybe earleana Kauffman 1924
Inocybe echinosimilis (E.Horak) Garrido 1988
Inocybe echinospora Egeland 1913
Inocybe egenula J.Favre 1955
Inocybe elegans Reumaux 2001
Inocybe elliptica Takah.Kobay. 2002
Inocybe emergens (Cleland) Grgur. 1997
Inocybe enigmatica Matheny & Aime 2012
Inocybe epidendron Matheny, Aime & T.W.Henkel 2003
Inocybe ericetorum Vauras & Kokkonen 2013
Inocybe erinaceomorpha Stangl & J.Veselský 1979 – United Kingdom
Inocybe erythospilota Grund & D.E.Stuntz 1984
Inocybe erythrobasis Singer 1954
Inocybe eurycystis E.H.L.Krause 1929
Inocybe euthelella Peck 1915
Inocybe eutheloides Peck 1887
Inocybe excoriata Peck 1904
Inocybe exigua (Cleland) Grgur. 1997
Inocybe exilis (Kuyper) Jacobsson & E.Larss. 2008

F

Inocybe fallax Peck 1904
Inocybe fastigiella G.F.Atk. 1918 – United Kingdom
Inocybe fastuosa Tak.Kobay. 1995
Inocybe favrei Bon 1985
Inocybe favrei-cavipes Bon 1997
Inocybe fechtneri Velen. 1920
Inocybe felipponei (Speg.) Singer 1951
Inocybe ferruginea Bon 1978
Inocybe fibrillosa Peck 1888
Inocybe fibrillosibrunnea O.K.Mill. & R.N.Hilton 1987
Inocybe fibrosa (Sowerby) Gillet 1876
Inocybe fibrosoides Kühner 1933 – United Kingdom
Inocybe flagellata (Reumaux) Reumaux 2001
Inocybe flavella P.Karst. 1890 – United Kingdom
Inocybe flavobrunnea Y.C.Wang 1973
Inocybe flavobrunnescens
Inocybe flocculosa Sacc. 1887 – Europe
Inocybe floridana Murrill 1945
Inocybe fraudans (Britzelm.) Sacc. 1887 – Europe
Inocybe frigidula J.Favre 1955
Inocybe frumentacea (Lam. & DC.) Bres. 1900
Inocybe fuegiana (Speg.) Speg. 1891
Inocybe fuligineoatra Huijsman 1955 – United Kingdom
Inocybe fulvella Bres. 1892
Inocybe fulvelliceps Murrill 1945
Inocybe fulviceps Murrill 1945
Inocybe fulvida Bres. 1930
Inocybe fulvidula Velen. 1939
Inocybe fulvilubrica Matheny, Bougher & G.M.Gates 2012
Inocybe fulvipes Kühner 1988
Inocybe fulvo-olivacea Cleland 1933
Inocybe fulvoumbonata Murrill 1945
Inocybe fumosifolia Speg. 1926
Inocybe furcata Takah.Kobay. 2003
Inocybe furfurea Kühner 1955
Inocybe fuscata Singer 1953
Inocybe fuscescentipes Kühner 1988
Inocybe fuscicothurnata Grund & D.E.Stuntz 1975
Inocybe fuscidula Velen. 1920 – United Kingdom; Western Cape Province
Inocybe fuscocinnamomea Singer 1953
Inocybe fuscodisca (Peck) Massee 1904
Inocybe fuscomarginata Kühner 1956 – United Kingdom
Inocybe fuscoperonata Corner & E.Horak 1979
Inocybe fuscospinulosa Corner & E.Horak 1979
Inocybe fusipes Bizio, Franchi & M.Marchetti 2006

G

Inocybe gemina (E.Horak) Garrido 1988
 Inocybe geophylla (Bull.) P.Kumm. 1871 – Europe
Inocybe geophyllomorpha Singer 1953
Inocybe geraniodora J.Favre 1955
Inocybe ghanaensis Pegler 1969 – Ghana
Inocybe giacomi  J.Favre 1955
Inocybe gibbosula (E.Horak) Garrido 1988
Inocybe gigacystis Singer 1953
Inocybe gigantea Bon 1996
Inocybe gigantispora Murrill 1945
Inocybe gintliana Velen. 1920
Inocybe glabra Kauffman 1918
Inocybe glabrescens Velen. 1920 – Europe
Inocybe glabripes Ricken 1915 – United Kingdom, Western Australia
Inocybe glabrodisca P.D.Orton 1960 – United Kingdom
Inocybe glareophila Bidaud & Fillion 1993
Inocybe glaucodisca Buyck & Eyssart. 1999
Inocybe glutinosifibrillosa Takah.Kobay. 2002
 Inocybe godeyi Gillet 1874 – Europe
Inocybe godfrinioides Kühner 1988
Inocybe goniopusio Stangl 1989
Inocybe gracillima Carteret & Reumaux 2012
Inocybe grammata Quél. 1880 – United Kingdom
Inocybe grammocephala Malençon 1970
Inocybe grammopodia Malençon 1970
Inocybe granulosiceps (E.Horak) Garrido 1988
Inocybe granulosipes Cleland 1933
Inocybe griseobrunnea Métrod 195
Inocybe griseola Takah.Kobay. 2002 – Honshu
Inocybe griseolilacina J.E.Lange 1917 – United Kingdom
Inocybe griseorubida K.P.D.Latha & Manim. 2015 – India
Inocybe griseoscabrosa (Peck) Earle 1903
Inocybe griseotarda Poirier 2002
Inocybe griseovelata Kühner 1955 – United Kingdom
Inocybe guttulifer Kühner 1988
Inocybe gymnocarpa Kühner 1953
Inocybe gymnopilus Kühner 1988

H

Inocybe haemacta (Berk. & Cooke) Sacc. 1887 – United Kingdom
Inocybe halophila R.Heim 1931
Inocybe hebelomoides Murrill 1945
Inocybe heimii Bon 1984 – Europe
Inocybe hemileuca F.H.Nishida & D.E.Stuntz 1988
Inocybe henryi Reumaux 1999
Inocybe heterochrominea Grund & D.E.Stuntz 1983
Inocybe heterocystis Kühner 1988
Inocybe heterosemen Carteret & Reumaux 2012
Inocybe hettematica (Britzelm.) Sacc. & Traverso 1910
Inocybe hinnulea Kühner 1988
Inocybe hinoana Yukawa & Katum. 1954
Inocybe hirculus Vauras 1995
Inocybe hirtella Bres. 1884 – Europe
Inocybe hirtelloides Stangl & J.Veselský 1974
Inocybe holoxantha Grund & D.E.Stuntz 1981
Inocybe homomorpha (Singer) Singer 1931
Inocybe horakii Raithelh. 1977
Inocybe hotsoniana D.E.Stuntz 1947
Inocybe huijsmanii Kuyper 1986 – United Kingdom
Inocybe humilis (J.Favre & E.Horak) Esteve-Rav. & Vila 1998
Inocybe hydrocybiformis (Corner & E.Horak) Garrido 1988
Inocybe hygrophana Glowinski & Stangl 1981
Inocybe hygrophoroides Shchukin 1985
Inocybe hygrophorus Kühner 1956
Inocybe hypervelata Bizio & Cervini 2005
Inocybe hyperythra Rick 1930
Inocybe hypophaea Furrer-Ziogas 1952
Inocybe hypotheja Kühner 1988
 Inocybe hystrix (Fr.) P.Karst. 1879

I
Inocybe ianthinofolia Pegler 1983
Inocybe imbricata (Cleland) Garrido 1988
Inocybe immaculipes Kühner 1988
Inocybe immigrans Malloch 1982
Inocybe impexa (Lasch) Kuyper 1986 – United Kingdom
Inocybe inaensis Kobayasi 1952
Inocybe incarnata Bres. 1884
Inocybe incognita (E.Horak) Garrido 1988
Inocybe indica Sarwal 1983
Inocybe infelix Peck 1887
Inocybe infida (Peck) Massee 1910
Inocybe infracta Velen. 1920
Inocybe infumata Kühner 1988
Inocybe ingae Pegler 1983
Inocybe inodora Velen. 1920 – United Kingdom
Inocybe insignis A.H.Sm. 1941
Inocybe insignissima Romagn. 1979
Inocybe insinuata Kauffman 1924
Inocybe insuavis (Britzelm.) Sacc. & Traverso 1910
Inocybe intricata Peck 1909
Inocybe invenusta (Britzelm.) Sacc. & Traverso 1910 (accepted name)
Inocybe involuta Kuyper 1989
Inocybe ionides Corner & E. Horak 1979
Inocybe ionochlora Romagn. 1979
Inocybe irregularinodulosa Takah.Kobay. 2002
Inocybe iseranensis E.Ferrari 2010

J

Inocybe jacobi Kühner 1956 – Europe
Inocybe jalapensis (Murrill) Singer 1958
Inocybe jamaicensis Murrill 1912
Inocybe javorkae Babos & Stangl 1985
Inocybe johannae Kühner 1988
Inocybe juniperina M.Marchetti, Franchi & Bizio 2004

K
Inocybe kasugayamensis Hongo 1963
Inocybe kauffmanii A.H.Sm. 1939
Inocybe kittilensis Kokkonen & Vauras 2013
Inocybe kobayasii Hongo 1959
Inocybe kohistanensis S.Jabeen, I.Ahmad & A.N.Khalid 2016
Inocybe krieglsteineri Fernández Sas. 2005

L
 Inocybe lacera (Fr.) P.Kumm. 1871 – Europe
Inocybe laeta Alessio 1979
Inocybe laetior D.E.Stuntz 1950
Inocybe laevispora Hruby 1930
Inocybe lageniformis Takah.Kobay. 2002
Inocybe lanatodisca Kauffman 1918 – USA
Inocybe langei R.Heim 1931
Inocybe lanuginosa (Bull.) P.Kumm. 1871 – United Kingdom
Inocybe lapponica Kokkonen & Vauras 2013
Inocybe lasseri Dennis 1953
Inocybe lasseroides (E.Horak) Garrido 1988
Inocybe lateraria Rick 1920
Inocybe latericia E.Horak 1978
Inocybe lavandulochlora Esteve-Rav. & M.Villarreal 2001
Inocybe leonina  Esteve-Rav. & A. Caball. 2009
Inocybe lepidocephala Speg. 1898
Inocybe lepidotella Matheny & Aime 2012
Inocybe lepiotoides Reumaux 1983
Inocybe leptoclada Takah. Kobay. & Courtec. 200
Inocybe leptocystella G.F.Atk. 1918
Inocybe leptocystis G.F.Atk. 1918 – United Kingdom
Inocybe leptoderma Takah. Kobay. & Nukada 2002
Inocybe leptophylla G.F.Atk. 1918 – United Kingdom
Inocybe leucoblema Kühner 1956
Inocybe leucoloma Kühner 1988
Inocybe leucopoda Velen. 1920
Inocybe lilacinolamellata (Britzelm.) Sacc. & Traverso 1910
Inocybe lilacinosquamosa Matheny, Aime & T.W.Henkel 2003
Inocybe lilofastigiata (Stangl & J.Veselský) Bon 1996
Inocybe littoralis Pegler 1983
Inocybe longipes Massee 1908
Inocybe longispora M.Lange 1957
Inocybe lorillardiana Murrill 1911
Inocybe lutea Kobayasi & Hongo 1952
Inocybe luteifolia A.H.Sm. 1941
Inocybe luteipes J.Favre 1955
Inocybe luteobulbosa E.Horak 1978
Inocybe luteola Takah.Kobay. 2009
Inocybe lutescens Velen. 1920

M

Inocybe macrocystis Velen. 1920
Inocybe macrosperma Hongo 1959
Inocybe macrospora Kobayasi 1971
 Inocybe maculata Boud. 1885 – United Kingdom
Inocybe maculipes J.Favre 1955
Inocybe magnicarpa Takah.Kobay. 2005
Inocybe magnifica (E.Horak) Garrido 1988
Inocybe magnifolia Matheny, Aime & T.W.Henkel 2012
Inocybe malenconiana Bon 1997
Inocybe malenconii R.Heim 1931
Inocybe mammifera M.M.Moser 1992
Inocybe mammosa Velen. 1920
Inocybe manuelae E.Ferrari & Bizio 2006
Inocybe margaritispora (Berk.) Sacc. 1887 – United Kingdom
Inocybe marginata Matheny, Aime & T.W.Henkel 2012
Inocybe mariluanensis (Speg.) Singer 1951
Inocybe maritimoides (Peck) Sacc. 1887
Inocybe marmoripes G.F.Atk. 1918
Inocybe martinica Pegler 1983 – Martinique
Inocybe mascardi Raithelh. 1990
Inocybe masoviensis Rudn.-Jez. 1967
Inocybe matrisdei Singer 1962
Inocybe mediocris (Corner & E.Horak) Garrido 1988
Inocybe megalospora Rick 1919
Inocybe melampyri Velen. 1947
Inocybe melanopoda D.E.Stuntz 1954
Inocybe melanopus D.E.Stuntz 1954
Inocybe melissolens Reumaux 2001
Inocybe melleiconica Grund & D.E.Stuntz 1968
Inocybe melliolens Kühner 1988
Inocybe mendica E.Horak 1978
Inocybe menthi-gustans F.H.Nishida 1988
Inocybe metrodii Stangl & J.Veselský 1979
Inocybe microfastigiata Kühner 1988
Inocybe microteroxantha Grund & D.E.Stuntz 1981
Inocybe mimica Massee 1904
Inocybe minima Peck 1913
Inocybe minimispora Reumaux 1986
Inocybe minuta P.Karst. 1906
Inocybe minutispora Murrill 1945
Inocybe minutissima Carteret & Reumaux 2012
Inocybe mirabilis Velen. 1920
Inocybe misakaensis Matheny & Watling 2004
Inocybe mitracea Velen. 1920
Inocybe mixtiliformis Singer 1954
Inocybe mixtilis (Britzelm.) Sacc. 1887 – United Kingdom; Malawi; Western Cape Province; Zambia
Inocybe moelleri Eyssart. & A.Delannoy 2006
Inocybe monochroa J. Favre 1955
Inocybe montana Kobayasi 1952
Inocybe monticola Kropp, Matheny & Nanagy. 2010
Inocybe moravica Hruby 1930
Inocybe mucronata R. Heim 1931
Inocybe multicingulata E.Horak 1979
Inocybe multicolor Raithelh. 1977
Inocybe multicoronata A.H.Sm. 1939
Inocybe multispora Murrill 1945
Inocybe muricellata Bres. 1905 – United Kingdom
Inocybe murrayana Cleland 1933
Inocybe mussooriensis Sarwal 1983
Inocybe mutata (Peck) Massee 1904
Inocybe mycenoides Kuyper 1986 – United Kingdom
Inocybe myriadophylla Vauras & E.Larss. 2012
Inocybe mystica Stangl & Glowinski 1980
Inocybe mytiliodora Stangl & Vauras 1988 – United Kingdom

N

Inocybe nana F.H.Møller 1945
Inocybe napiformis Takah.Kobay. 2009
Inocybe napipes J.E.Lange 1917 – United Kingdom
Inocybe naucoriiformis Velen. 1939
Inocybe nematoloma Joss. 1974
Inocybe nemorosa (R.Heim) Grund & D.E.Stuntz 1968
Inocybe neobrunnescens Grund & D.E.Stuntz 1970
Inocybe neoflocculosa Kobayasi 1952
Inocybe neomicrospora Kobayasi 1952
Inocybe neorufula Esteve-Rav., Macau & Ferville 2012
Inocybe neotropicalis Singer, I.J.A.Aguiar & Ivory 1983
Inocybe neoumbrina Kobayasi 1952
Inocybe neuhoffii Bres. 1926
Inocybe neuquenensis Singer 1954
Inocybe nigrescens G.F.Atk. 191
Inocybe nigrescentipes Reumaux 2001
Inocybe nigridisca Peck 1888
Inocybe niigatensis Hongo 1959
Inocybe nikkoensis  Kobayasi 1952
Inocybe nitida Velen. 1920
Inocybe nitidiuscula (Britzelm.) Lapl. 1894 – Europe
Inocybe niveivelata D.E.Stuntz ex Kropp, Matheny & Hutchison 2013 – USA
Inocybe nobilis (R.Heim) Alessio 1980
Inocybe nodulosa Kauffman 1924
Inocybe nodulosospora Kobayasi 1952
Inocybe nodulospora (Peck) Sacc. 1891
Inocybe notodryina Singer, I.J.A.Aguiar & Ivory 1983
Inocybe nucleata Murrill 1945
Inocybe nuda Velen. 1920
Inocybe numerosigibba Takah.Kobay. 2002

O

Inocybe oblectabilis (Britzelm.) Sacc. 1895 – United Kingdom
Inocybe obscurella Carteret & Reumaux 2012
Inocybe obscurobadia (J.Favre) Grund & D.E.Stuntz 1977 – United Kingdom
Inocybe obscuromellea Poirier 2002
Inocybe obsoleta Romagn. 1958 – Europe, USA
Inocybe obtusiuscula Kühner 1988
Inocybe occidentalis Kropp, Matheny & Hutchison 2013 – USA
Inocybe ochracea Stangl 1979
Inocybe ochraceomarginata Kauffman 1924
Inocybe ochraceoscabra G.F.Atk. 1918
Inocybe ochroalba Bruyl. 1970 – United Kingdom
Inocybe ochrofulva Malençon 1970
Inocybe ochroleuca J.Favre 1955
Inocybe ochrorufa Sarwal 1983
Inocybe odora Velen. 1939
Inocybe oehrensii Garrido & E.Horak 1988
Inocybe olgae Velen. 1920
Inocybe olida Maire 1933 – United Kingdom
Inocybe olidissima (Ripart) Poirier & Reumaux 1990
Inocybe olivaceobrunnea J.Favre ex Kuyper 1986
Inocybe olivaceonigra (E.Horak) Garrido 1988
Inocybe olorinata E.Horak 1979
Inocybe olpidiocystis G.F.Atk. 1918
Inocybe olympiana A.H.Sm. 1939
Inocybe orbata Malençon 1970
Inocybe oreadoides Carteret 2000
Inocybe oreina J.Favre 1955
Inocybe ortegae Esteve-Rav. 2001
Inocybe ovatocystis Boursier & Kühner 1928
Inocybe ovoidea Takah.Kobay. 2003
Inocybe ovoideicystis  Métrod 1956
Inocybe ozeensis  Kobayasi 1952

P

Inocybe pachycreas R.Heim & Romagn. 1931
Inocybe pachydermica Takah.Kobay. 2002
Inocybe pachypleura Takah.Kobay. 2002
Inocybe pahangi  (Corner & E.Horak) Garrido 1988
Inocybe palaeotropica  E.Turnbull & Watling 1995
Inocybe pallescens Velen. 1920
Inocybe pallida  Velen. 1920 – Europe
Inocybe pallidicremea  Grund & D.E.Stuntz 1977
Inocybe pallidobrunnea Kauffman 1924
Inocybe pallidospora Beller & Bon 1997
Inocybe paludicola Kokkonen & Vauras 2013
Inocybe paludinella (Peck) Sacc. 1887 – United Kingdom
Inocybe paludosa Kühner 1988
Inocybe paludosella G.F.Atk. 1918
Inocybe papillata  (E.Horak) Garrido 1988
Inocybe paradoxa R.Heim 1934
Inocybe paralanuginosa Pegler 1983 – Guadeloupe
Inocybe pararubens Carteret & Reumaux 2012
Inocybe parcecoacta Grund & D.E.Stuntz 1977
Inocybe pargasensis Vauras 1997
Inocybe parvispora Murrill 1945
Inocybe patibilis Reumaux 1988
Inocybe paucicystidiosa (Bon) Franchi & M.Marchetti 2008
Inocybe paucigibba Singer 1965
Inocybe pedemontana Alessio 1980
Inocybe pedicellata Velen. 1920
Inocybe pedunculata Velen. 1920
Inocybe pegleri Sarwal 1983
Inocybe pelargoniodora Kühner 1988
Inocybe pelargonium Kühner 1955 – Europe
Inocybe perlata (Cooke) Sacc. 1887 – United Kingdom
Inocybe permucida  Grund & D.E.Stuntz 1983
Inocybe pernivosa (Murrill) Singer 1951
Inocybe peronatella J.Favre 1960
Inocybe perpusilla Velen. 1920
Inocybe personata Kühner 1955
Inocybe pertomentosa Murrill 1945
Inocybe petchii Boedijn 1951
Inocybe petiginosa  (Fr.) Gillet 1876 – United Kingdom
Inocybe petroselinolens  Carteret & Reumaux 2012
Inocybe phaeocystidiosa  Esteve-Rav., G.Moreno & Bon 1987
Inocybe phaeodisca Kühner 1955 – Europe
Inocybe phaeoleuca Kühner 1955 – Europe
Inocybe phaeosquarrosa E.Horak 1978
Inocybe pholiotinoides Romagn. 1979
Inocybe picetorum Velen. 1920
Inocybe picrosma D.E.Stuntz 1950
Inocybe pintureaui Duchemin 1979
Inocybe piricystis J.Favre 1955
Inocybe plocamophora Singer, I.J.A.Aguiar & Ivory 1983
Inocybe pluteoides Höhn. 1907
Inocybe polycystidiata Kobayasi 1952
Inocybe polytrichi-norvegici Kühner 1988
Inocybe populea Takah.Kobay. & Courtec. 2000
Inocybe porcorum Kokkonen & Vauras 2013
Inocybe posterula (Britzelm.) Sacc. 1887 – United Kingdom
Inocybe poujolii R.Heim 1931
Inocybe prae-echinulata Murrill 1941
Inocybe praecox Kropp, Matheny & Nanagy. 2010
Inocybe praefarinacea (Murrill) Singer 1951
Inocybe praenodulosa Murrill 1941
Inocybe praenucleata Murrill 1945
 Inocybe praetervisa Quél. 1883 – United Kingdom
Inocybe procera  E.Horak 1979
Inocybe prominens Kauffman 1924
Inocybe proximella P.Karst. 1882 – United Kingdom
Inocybe pruinosa  R.Heim 1931 – United Kingdom
Inocybe psammobrunnea Bon 1990
Inocybe pseudo-orbata Esteve-Rav. & García Blanco 2003
Inocybe pseudoasterospora Kühner & Boursier 1932 – United Kingdom
Inocybe pseudobrunnea Alessio 1987
Inocybe pseudoconfusa  Métrod 1956
Inocybe pseudocookei Métrod ex Bon 1996
Inocybe pseudodestricta Stangl & J.Veselský 1973 – United Kingdom
Inocybe pseudoflocculosa Kühner 1988
Inocybe pseudograta Alessio 1983
Inocybe pseudogriseolilacina G.Y.Zheng & Z.S.Bi 1997
Inocybe pseudohaemacta Bon & Courtec. 1985
Inocybe pseudohiulca Kühner 1933 – United Kingdom
Inocybe pseudonobilis Reumaux 2001
Inocybe pseudoreducta Stangl & Glowinski 1981 – United Kingdom
Inocybe pseudorhacodes Tak. Kobay. & Courtec. 1993
Inocybe pseudorubens Carteret & Reumaux 2001
Inocybe pseudotarda Moënne-Loccoz & Poirier 2012
Inocybe pseudoteraturgus Vauras & Kokkonen 2013
Inocybe pseudoumbrina Stangl 1975
Inocybe pulchella Matheny, Aime & T.W.Henkel 2003
Inocybe pullata A.Pearson ex Pegler 1996 – Western Cape Province
Inocybe punctatosquamosa (E.Horak) Garrido 1988
Inocybe purpureobadia Esteve-Rav. & A.Caball. 2009
Inocybe purpureoflavida K.B.Vrinda & C.K.Pradeep 1997 – Kerala
Inocybe pusillima (Corner & E. Horak) Garrido 1988
Inocybe pusina F.H.Møller 1945
Inocybe pusio P.Karst. 1889 – United Kingdom
Inocybe putilla  Bres. 1884 – United Kingdom
Inocybe pyriformis Takah. Kobay. & S.Kurogi 2009
Inocybe pyriodora (Pers.) P.Kumm. 1871 – United Kingdom
Inocybe pyrotricha D.E.Stuntz 1950

Q
Inocybe queletii Konrad 1929
Inocybe quercetorum Reumaux 2001
Inocybe quercina Hongo 1982
Inocybe quietiodor  Bon 1976 – United Kingdom

R

Inocybe radiata Peck 1895
Inocybe rainierensis D.E.Stuntz 1950
Inocybe rasiana  Sacc. & Trotter 1920
Inocybe ravaensis Kalamees & Shchukin 1985
Inocybe redolens Matheny, Bougher & G.M.Gates 2012
Inocybe reisneri Velen. 1920
Inocybe relicina (Fr.) Quél. 1888 – United Kingdom
Inocybe renispora E.Horak 1978
Inocybe rennyi (Berk. & Broome) Sacc. 1887 – United Kingdom
Inocybe reticulata Cout. 1925
Inocybe retipes G.F.Atk. 1918
Inocybe rhodella Matheny, Aime & M.E.Sm. 2012
Inocybe rhombispora Massee 1905
Inocybe rigidipes Peck 1898
 Inocybe rimosa  (Bull.) P.Kumm. 1871 – Europe
Inocybe rimosobispora Bizio, Esteve-Rav. & Contu 2005
Inocybe rimosoides Peck 1911
Inocybe rivularis Jacobsson & Vauras 1990
Inocybe robertii Esteve-Rav. & A.Caball. 2009
Inocybe rocabrunae Esteve-Rav. & Vila 2002
Inocybe rohlenae Velen. 1920
Inocybe romana Lonati 1985
Inocybe roseifolia Murrill 1945
Inocybe roseipes Malençon 1970
Inocybe rosella Velen. 1920
Inocybe rosellicaularis Grund & D.E.Stuntz 1983
Inocybe rostrata Velen. 1920
Inocybe rubellipes G.F.Atk. 1918
Inocybe rubens (R.Heim) Huijsman 1953
Inocybe rubidofracta E.Ferrari 2010
Inocybe rubroindica Banning & Peck 1891
Inocybe rufidula Kauffman 1924
Inocybe rufobrunnea J.Favre 195
Inocybe rufofusca (J.Favre) Bon 1997
Inocybe rufolutea J.Favre 1955
Inocybe rufotacta Schwöbel & Stangl 1982
Inocybe rufula Malençon ex Alessio 1986
Inocybe rufuloides Bon 1984
Inocybe rupestris J.Favre 1955

S

Inocybe saliceticola Vauras & Kokkonen 2008
 Inocybe salicis  Kühner 1955 – United Kingdom
Inocybe salicis-herbaceae Kühner 1988
Inocybe sambucella G.F.Atk. 1918
Inocybe sambucina (Fr.) Quél. 1872 – United Kingdom
Inocybe sandrae Zitzmann 2002
Inocybe sapinea Velen. 1939
Inocybe saponacea Kuyper 1986
Inocybe scabelliformis Malençon 1970
Inocybe scabriuscula E.Horak 1978
Inocybe sclerotiicola R.Heim & Gilles 1969
Inocybe semifulva Grund & D.E.Stuntz 1981
Inocybe semilutescens Singer 1969
Inocybe senkawaensis Kobayasi 1952
Inocybe sericella Takah. Kobay. & S. Onishi 2010
Inocybe sericeopoda Furrer-Ziogas 1995
Inocybe serotina Peck 1904 – United Kingdom
Inocybe serrata Cleland 1933
Inocybe shoreae (E.Horak & Bas) Garrido 1988
Inocybe sibionipes Deïana & Carteret 2002
Inocybe sierraensis Kropp & Matheny 2004
Inocybe silvae-herbaceae Kokkonen & Vauras 2013
Inocybe similis Bres. 1905
Inocybe sindonia (Fr.) P.Karst. 1879 – United Kingdom
Inocybe sinuospora Matheny & Bougher 2012
Inocybe siskiyouensis Kauffman 1930
Inocybe solida Velen. 1939
Inocybe solidipes Kühner 1988
Inocybe soluta Velen. 1920 – Canary Islands; United Kingdom
Inocybe sordida Rick 1920
Inocybe sororia Kauffman 1924
Inocybe specialis (Britzelm.) Sacc. & Traverso 1910
Inocybe sphaerospora Kobayasi 1952
Inocybe spinosae Velen. 1939
Inocybe splendens R.Heim 1932 – United Kingdom
Inocybe splendentoides  Bon 1990
Inocybe splendidissima Carteret & Reumaux 2001
Inocybe spuria Jacobsson & E.Larss. 2009 – Sweden, Norway, Finland, USA
Inocybe squamata  J.E.Lange 1917  – United Kingdom
Inocybe squamosa Bres. 1902
Inocybe squamosodisca Peck 1904
Inocybe squamulosa Kobayasi 1952
Inocybe squarrosa Rea 1916
Inocybe squarrosoamethystina Singer 1938
Inocybe squarrosoannulata Kühner 1988
Inocybe squarrosolutea (Corner & E.Horak) Garrido 1988
Inocybe stangliana Kuyper 1986
Inocybe staurospora (E.Horak) Garrido 1988
Inocybe stellatospora (Peck) Massee 1904 – United Kingdom
Inocybe stenospora Stangl & Bresinsky 1983
Inocybe straminipes Romagn. 1979
Inocybe striaepes  Kühner 1988
Inocybe striatiformis Murrill 1945
Inocybe striatorimosa P.D.Orton 1960 – United Kingdom
Inocybe striatula (Cleland) Grgur. 1997
Inocybe strobilomyces E.Horak 1978
Inocybe stuntzii Grund 1975
Inocybe suaveolens D.E.Stuntz 1950
Inocybe subalbidodisca Stangl & J.Veselský 1975
Inocybe subannulata Kühner 1988
Inocybe subargentea Singer 1938
Inocybe subasterospora Cleland & Cheel 1918
Inocybe subbrunnea Kühner 1955
Inocybe subcarpta Kühner & Boursier 1932 – Europe
Inocybe subconnexa Murrill 1945
Inocybe subdecipiens Bres. ex Bellù, Bizio & M.Marchetti 1998
Inocybe subdestricta Kauffman 1924
Inocybe subeutheloides Murrill 1941
Inocybe subexilis (Peck) Sacc. 1887
Inocybe subfibrosoides Singer 1953
Inocybe subfulva Peck 1888
Inocybe subfulviforims Murrill 1945
Inocybe subfulviformis Murrill 1945
Inocybe subfusca Kühner 1988
Inocybe subfuscocinnamomea Singer 1954
Inocybe subgeophylla Henn. 1899
Inocybe subgeophyllomorpha Singer 1954
Inocybe subgigacystis Singer 1954
Inocybe subhirsuta Kühner 1988
Inocybe subhirtella Bon 1984
Inocybe sublanuginosa Rick 1938
Inocybe sublongipes Murrill 1945
Inocybe submaculipes J.Favre 1960
Inocybe submicrospora Velen. 1947
Inocybe submuricellata G.F.Atk. 1918
Inocybe subnodulosa Murrill 1941
Inocybe subnudipes Kühner 1955
Inocybe subochracea (Peck) Sacc. 1905
Inocybe suboreina Moënne-Locc., Poirier & Reumaux 1990
Inocybe subpaleacea Kühner 1988
Inocybe subpelargonium Beller 1982
Inocybe subporospora Kuyper 1986 – Italy
Inocybe subprominens Murrill 1941
Inocybe subradiata Murrill 1945
Inocybe subroindica Banning & Peck 1891
Inocybe subrubens Carteret & Reumaux 2012
Inocybe subrubescens G.F.Atk. 1918
Inocybe substellata Kühner 1988
Inocybe substraminea Alessio 1980
Inocybe substraminipes  Kühner 1988
Inocybe subtilis Takah. Kobay. 200
Inocybe subtomentosa Peck 1897
Inocybe subtrivialis Esteve-Rav., M.Villarreal & Heykoop 1997
Inocybe subvatricosa Rick 1938
Inocybe subvirgata Reumaux 2001
Inocybe subvolvata Hongo 1963
Inocybe sulcata Moënne-Locc., Poirier & Reumaux 1990
Inocybe sulfovirescens Poirier 2002

T

Inocybe tabacina  Furrer-Ziogas 1952
Inocybe taedophila Murrill 1945
Inocybe tahquamenonensis D.E.Stuntz 1954
Inocybe tarda Kühner 1955
Inocybe tauensis Kropp & Albee-Scott 2010
Inocybe taxocystis (J.Favre & E.Horak) Senn-Irlet 1992
Inocybe tenbricoides Kühner 1988
Inocybe tenebrosa Quél. 1885 – Europe
Inocybe tenerella (J.Favre) J.Favre 1960
Inocybe tenerrima G.F.Atk. 1918
Inocybe tequendamae Singer 1963
Inocybe teraturgus M.M.Moser 1992
Inocybe tetragonospora Kühner 1988
Inocybe terrifera Kühner 1955
Inocybe terrigena (Fr.) Kuyper 1985
Inocybe texensis Thiers 1960
Inocybe tigrina R.Heim 1931
Inocybe tigrinella Carteret & Reumaux 2012
Inocybe titibuensis Kobayasi 1952
Inocybe tjallingiorum Kuyper 1986 – United Kingdom
Inocybe tonalei Bizio & C.Rossi 2009
Inocybe torresiae Matheny, Bougher & M.D.Barrett 2012
Inocybe transiens Takah.Kobay. 2002
Inocybe treneri Bres. 1926
 Inocybe tricolor Kühner 1955 (psychoactive)
 Inocybe tristis Hruby 1930
Inocybe tropicalis Guzmán 1982
Inocybe tubarioides G.F.Atk. 1918
Inocybe tulearensis L.M.Dufour & H.Poiss. 1927
Inocybe turfosa Velen. 1939

U
Inocybe uliginosa Velen. 1920
Inocybe umboninota Peck 1885
Inocybe umbratica  Quél. 1884 – United Kingdom
Inocybe umbrinescens Murrill 1945
Inocybe umbrinodisca Kühner 1988
Inocybe umbrinofusca Kühner 1988
Inocybe umbrinovirens E.Horak 1979
Inocybe umbrosa E.Horak 1978
Inocybe undulatospora Kuyper 1989
Inocybe unicolor Peck 1898
Inocybe urbana  Alessio 1980
Inocybe urceolicystis Stangl & Vauras 1988
Inocybe ursinella M.Lange 1957

V

Inocybe vaccina Kühner 1955 – United Kingdom
Inocybe valida Malençon 1979
Inocybe variabillima Speg. 1898
Inocybe variispora Fernández Sas. 2002
Inocybe vatricosoides  Peck 1910
Inocybe velata Franchi & M.Marchetti 2008
Inocybe velenovskyi Boursier & Kühner 1928
Inocybe velifera (Kühner) Bon 1997
Inocybe ventricosa G.F.Atk. 1918
Inocybe verbanensis Bon & E.Ferrari 2006
Inocybe vialis  Murrill 1945
Inocybe vinosistipitata Grund & D.E. Stuntz 1983
Inocybe violacea Massee 1899
Inocybe violaceifolia  Peck 1888
Inocybe violaceoalbipes G.F.Atk. 1918
Inocybe violaceocaulis Matheny & Bougher 2005 (prev. I. geophylla var. lilacina) In Western Australia, what represents I. violaceocaulis was earlier referred to as I. geophylla var. lilacina by some Australian taxonomists, which Matheny & Bougher (2005) point to as a misapplication of the name I. geophylla var. lilacina
Inocybe violaceolamellata Rick 1930
Inocybe violaceovelata E.Horak 1979
Inocybe violeipes  E.Horak 1979
Inocybe virgata G.F.Atk. 1918
Inocybe viridiumbonata  Pegler 1983
Inocybe viscidula R.Heim 1931
Inocybe volvata D.E.Stuntz 1947
Inocybe vulpina Takah. Kobay. 2002
Inocybe vulpinella Bruyl. 1970

W
Inocybe weberi Murrill 1945
Inocybe whitei (Berk. & Broome) Sacc. 1887 – Europe

X
Inocybe xantholeuca Kuyper 1986
Inocybe xanthomelas Boursier & Kühner 1933 – United Kingdom
Inocybe xerophytica Pegler 1983

Z
Inocybe zangherii Bres. 1930
Inocybe zonatipes E.Horak 1979

References

Literature

Inocybe
Inocybe